is a skyscraper and retail complex completed in 2018 in the Shibuya shopping district of Tokyo, Japan.  The building is located in the space vacated when the Tōkyū Tōyoko Line terminal in Shibuya was relocated underground in 2013.

Shibuya Stream hosts Google's Japan head office as well as the Excel Tokyu Shibuya Stream hotel.

References

Skyscraper office buildings in Tokyo
Retail buildings in Tokyo
Buildings and structures completed in 2018